The Škoda Fabia WRC is a World Rally Car built for the Škoda Motorsport by Škoda Auto in the World Rally Championship. It is based upon the Škoda Fabia road car, and was debuted at the 2003 Rally Deutschland. The R5 version was launched in 2015.

Competition history

The car was introduced at the 2003 Rally Deutschland, replacing the Octavia WRC. However, the car did not score any point in the season, which led the  season to a development year. The car won twelve stages in its fifty-seven contested WRC events, but failed to achieve any podium.

Gallery

References

External links
  

Fabia WRC
All-wheel-drive vehicles
Cars of the Czech Republic
World Rally Cars